The 2003 Connecticut Huskies football team represented the University of Connecticut in the 2003 NCAA Division I-A football season. The team was led by fifth-year head coach by Randy Edsall and played its home games at Rentschler Field in East Hartford, Connecticut.

Schedule

References

Connecticut
UConn Huskies football seasons
Connecticut Huskies football